may refer to:

 Mikazuki Station, Sayō, Hyōgo Prefecture, Japan
 Mikazuki, Hyōgo
 , Mutsuki-class Imperial Japanese Navy destroyer
 Mikazuki Munechika, one of the Tenka-Goken (Five Swords under Heaven)
 Mikazuki, a Danzan-ryū jujitsu technique

 Surname
 Akira Mikazuki (1921–2010), Japanese scholar and politician
 Taizō Mikazuki (born 1971), Japanese politician

Creative works
 "Mikazuki" (song), a song by Ayaka
 "Mikazuki", a song by Enon
 "Mikazuki", a [[List of One Piece chapters (1–186)#vol4|volume of manga series One Piece]]
 "Mikazuki", a cat of a character (Mitsuki) in the Boruto anime

See also
Mikatsuki, Saga, former town in Ogi District, Saga Prefecture, Japan

ja:三日月#三日月の名前がついているもの
Japanese-language surnames